Olga Printzlau (December 13, 1891 – July 8, 1962) was an American screenwriter. She wrote for more than 60 films between 1915 and 1933. She also wrote a play, Window Panes, which was staged in Los Angeles in 1928, and won praise from the Los Angeles Times. She was born in Philadelphia, Pennsylvania and died in Hollywood, California from a heart attack.

Selected filmography

 Coral (1915)
 Where the Forest Ends (1915)
 The Ring of Destiny (1915)
 A Soul Enslaved (1916)
 The Yaqui (1916)
 Two Men of Sandy Bar (1916)
 John Needham's Double (1916)
 Naked Hearts (1916)
 One More American (1918)
 Believe Me, Xantippe (1918)
 The City of Tears (1918)
 Lawless Love (1918)
 Why Change Your Wife? (1920)
 Jack Straw (1920)
 The Prince Chap (1920)
 Conrad in Quest of His Youth (1920)
 Midsummer Madness (1921)
 What Every Woman Knows (1921)
 The Lost Romance (1921)
 The Cradle (1922)
 Through a Glass Window (1922)
 The Bachelor Daddy (1922)
 Burning Sands (1922)
 The Beautiful and Damned (1922)
 Little Church Around the Corner (1923)
 Maytime (1923)
 Mothers-in-Law (1923)
 Daughters of the Rich (1923)
 Butterfly (1924)
 White Man (1924)
 The Age of Innocence (1924)
 Her Market Value (1925)
 Fifth Avenue Models (1925)
 Headlines (1925)
 The Beautiful Cheat (1926)
 Pals First (1926)
 The Miracle of Life (1926)
 Camille (1926)
 His Dog (1927)
 The Tragedy of Youth (1928)
 Fashion Madness (1928)
 Hearts of Humanity (1932)
 Broken Dreams (1933)
 Marriage on Approval (1933)

References

External links
 

Olga Printzlau at the Women Film Pioneers Project

1891 births
1962 deaths
Writers from Philadelphia
American women screenwriters
American women dramatists and playwrights
20th-century American dramatists and playwrights
20th-century American women writers
Women film pioneers
Screenwriters from Pennsylvania
20th-century American screenwriters